Princess Maria Carolina of Bourbon-Two Sicilies may refer to:

 Princess Maria Carolina of Bourbon-Two Sicilies (1820–1861), daughter of Francis I of the Two Sicilies, wife of Infante Carlos, Count of Montemolin
 Princess Maria Carolina of Bourbon-Two Sicilies (1822–1869), daughter of Leopold, Prince of Salerno, wife of Henri d'Orléans, Duke of Aumale
 Princess Maria Carolina of Bourbon-Two Sicilies (1856–1941), daughter of Prince Francis, Count of Trapani, wife of Count Andrzej Zamoyski

See also
 Princess Maria Carolina of Bourbon (born 2003), daughter of Prince Carlo, Duke of Castro, and Camilla Crociani